The list of kickboxers is divided into:

 List of male kickboxers
 List of female kickboxers

 
Kickboxing-related lists